Wayne Schaab (born December 3, 1948) is a Canadian retired professional ice hockey player. While he never played in the NHL, he was a top point producer throughout the 1970s and early 1980s in the AHL with the Richmond Robins and Maine Mariners, the CHL with the Omaha Knights, and the EHL with the Charlotte Checkers.

External links

1948 births
Canadian ice hockey centres
Charlotte Checkers (EHL) players
Ice hockey people from British Columbia
Living people
Maine Mariners players
Omaha Knights (CHL) players
Richmond Robins players
Sportspeople from Penticton